Vila Verde dos Francos is a  parish of the municipality of Alenquer, in western Portugal. The population in 2011 was 1,162, in an area of 28.13 km².

References

Parishes of Alenquer, Portugal